Sattar Khan is a 1972  Iranian biographical film directed by Ali Hatami. The film is about Sattar Khan, the Iranian national hero, and his primary role in the events of Persian Constitutional Revolution. Ali Nasirian, Ezzatollah Entezami, Parviz Sayyad, Enayat Bakhshi, and Jahangir Forouhar are among the actors.

Cast 
Ali Nasirian as Sattar Khan
Enayat Bakhshi as Bagher Khan
Ezzatollah Entezami as Haydar Khan e Amo-oghli
Parviz Sayyad as Ali Monsieur
Mohammad Ali Keshavarz as Abbas Atabak
Jahangir Forouhar
Mohammad Ali Sepanlu
Jalal Pishvayian
Abdol-Ali Homayun
Sadegh Bahrami
Sirous Ebrahim Zadeh
Bagher Sahrarudi

References

External links 

1972 films
1970s Persian-language films
1970s biographical films
1970s historical films
Films directed by Ali Hatami
Iranian biographical films
Iranian historical films